This is a list of Iranian football transfers for the 2009 summer transfer window. Only moves featuring at least one Iran Pro League or Azadegan League club are listed.

The summer transfer window opened on 23 May 2009 and will close at midnight on 27 July 2009. Players without a club may join one at any time, either during or in between transfer windows. Clubs can also sign players on loan at any point during the season. If need be, clubs may sign a goalkeeper on an emergency loan, if all others are unavailable.

As of this season each club is allowed to sign 6 Iranian players and 4 foreign players. In addition to this no team is permitted to sign a foreign goalkeeper.

Iran Pro League

Aboomoslem 

In:

Out:

Esteghlal Ahvaz 

In:

Out:

Esteghlal 

In:

Out:

Foolad 

In:

 
 
 

Out:

Malavan 

In:

Out:

 then to Paykan F.C.

Mes Kerman 

In:

Out:

Moghavemat Sepasi 

In:

Out:

PAS Hamedan 

In:

Out:

Paykan 

In:

Out:

Persepolis 

In:

Out:

Rah Ahan 

In:

Out:

Saipa 

In:

Out:

Saba Qom 

In:

Out:

Sepahan 

In:

Out:

Shahin Bushehr 

In:

Out:

Steel Azin 

In:

Out:

Tractor Sazi 

In:

Out:

Zob Ahan 

In:

Out:

Azadegan League

Aluminium Hormozgan 

In: 

Out:

Bargh Shiraz 

In: 

Out:

Damash Gilan 

In: 

Out:

Damash Iranian F.C.

In:

Out:

Foolad Novin F.C. 

In: 

Out:

Gostaresh Foolad F.C.

In:

Out:

Mes Rafsanjan F.C. 

In:

Out:

Naft Tehran F.C.

In:

Out:

Nassaji Mazandaran 

In:

 

Out:

Sanati Kaveh Tehran 

In:

Out:

Shensa Arak 

In:

Out:

Payam Mashhad 

In:

Out:

Shahin Ahvaz F.C.

In:

Out:

Shahrdari Tabriz 

In:

Out:

Sanat Naft Abadan F.C. 

In:

 

Out:

Tarbiat Yazd F.C. 

In: 

Out:

References

Iranian
Transfers Summer 2009
2009